Lucas Emanuel Ayala Miño (born August 11, 1978) is a former professional footballer who played as a midfielder and current manager of Liga Premier de México club Gavilanes de Matamoros. Born in Argentina, he represented the Mexico national team.

International career
On 16 January 2009, Ayala was called up to the Mexico national team. This caused some controversy among Mexico's native-born. He declared to the media that he wanted to give back the favours that Mexico has granted him such as his footballing career which started in Mexico, not Argentina. He was present with the squad that faced Sweden on 28 January 2009.

International caps 
As of 28 January 2009

References

External links
 
 
 

1978 births
Living people
Footballers from Buenos Aires
Argentine emigrants to Mexico
Naturalized citizens of Mexico
Mexican people of Argentine descent
Sportspeople of Argentine descent
Mexican people of Basque descent
Association football midfielders
Argentine footballers
Mexican footballers
Mexico international footballers
Correcaminos UAT footballers
Club Atlético Zacatepec players
C.D. Veracruz footballers
Tigres UANL footballers
Atlas F.C. footballers